Caloreas coloradella is a moth in the family Choreutidae. It was described by Harrison Gray Dyar Jr. in 1900. It is found in North America, where it has been recorded from Colorado and New Mexico.

References

Arctiidae genus list at Butterflies and Moths of the World of the Natural History Museum

Choreutidae
Moths described in 1900